Just for the Record... is a box set by American singer Barbra Streisand. It was released by Columbia Records on September 24, 1991. Streisand and her manager, Martin Erlichman, were credited as the album's executive producers. Just for the Record... includes a variety of performances throughout Streisand's career, including a song taken from her first studio recording session in 1955: a cover of "You'll Never Know". Other tracks were compiled from various live performances, TV specials, and previous albums from her back catalog.

Just for the Record... received positive reviews regarding its comprehensiveness of Streisand's overall career. Commercially, the album was equally successful, becoming the second best-selling box set in the United States by 1994, when it had sold over 404,000 units. It entered the Billboard 200 in the United States and peaked at number 38; it has also been certified Platinum by the Recording Industry Association of America (RIAA). In the Netherlands, Highlights from Just for the Record, a condensed version of the album, peaked at number 72.

Background and release 
Just for the Record... was released on September 24, 1991, by Columbia Records. It includes four discs, with each disc focusing on a different decade ("The 60s Part I", "The 60s Part II", "The 70s", and "The 80s"). It was initially priced at $79.98 USD and by 1994 was the second best-selling box set collection in the United States (behind only Led Zeppelin's 1990 self-titled box set) with approximately 404,000 copies sold. Serving as a retrospective of Streisand's three decade-spanning career, it features several songs from her catalogue in addition to previously unreleased tracks. Her first studio-recorded track ever, a cover of Mack Gordon and Harry Warren's "You'll Never Know" (1943), was featured as the album's opener track and was recorded in 1955. Howard Reich from PopMatters claimed that Streisand's cover proved that she already had had plenty of talent to become a recording artist, despite her young age. Despite the wide array of producers who contributed to the various tracks included in the collection, Streisand and her manager, Martin Erlichman, were credited as the album's two executive producers. In addition to the four discs of material, Just for the Record... includes a 92-page color booklet featuring a variety of photos and artwork created throughout her career.

Among the previously unreleased material of Just for the Record... are live performances on The Jack Paar Show, P.M. East, The Garry Moore Show, The Tonight Show, The Ed Sullivan Show, and The Judy Garland Show. Duets with Judy Garland, Harold Arlen, Don Rickles, and Ryan O'Neal are also featured. As a whole, the performances featured on the collection range in year recorded from 1955 to 1988. A condensed version of the box set titled Highlights from Just for the Record was released sometime in 1992. It includes 24 of the songs from Just for the Record... and was priced significantly lower than the original collection.

Reception 

Just for the Record... received high ratings and praise from music critics. William Ruhlmann from AllMusic enjoyed the unique nature of the record and commented that because "she had complete creative control over th[e] retrospective", she was able to release a box set consisting of nearly only "rare [and] previously unreleased material". He also labelled the duets with Garland and "Las Vegas Medley" as some of the album's best tracks. In the publication's review of Highlights from Just for the Record, Ruhlmann was equally appreciative and noted that it serves as a "fine overview of Bab's career" and provides for a "great listening". Describing the large size of the collection, Entertainment Weeklys David Browne compared it to the two installments of Use Your Illusion (volumes I and II) by Guns N' Roses and claimed that it "is impossible to digest in one sitting". Browne ultimately awarded the collection a grade of A- and called it a good representation of the singer's ability to "chang[e the] definition of pop" and "make mainstream adult pop that was strong, elegant, [and] even passionate". Joe Brown from The Washington Post was more mixed towards the effort: "All four discs are dotted with oddities that even the most devoted Barbraphiles will program their CD players to skip after the first listen or two"; however, Brown appreciated some of the rarities on the album, including her duets with Garland and her melody of "My Man" and "Auld Lang Syne".

The box set entered and peaked on the Billboard 200 at number 38 on October 12, 1991, and was the week's fifth highest-peaking debut. It dropped to number 63 the following week and spent a combined total of 16 weeks on the chart. On November 19, 1991, it was certified Gold as a multi-disk package by Recording Industry Association of America (RIAA) for physical shipments of 125,000 copies; its certification was then upgraded to Platinum, signifying shipments of 250,000 copies, on July 8, 1992. As of June 2007, Just for the Record... had sold 454,000 box sets in the United States. The Highlights from Just for the Record version entered the album charts in the Netherlands, where it spent three weeks in total and peaked at number 72.

Track listings

Just for the Record... 

Notes 
 "Judy Garland Medley, No. 1" consists of the songs "Hooray for Love", "After You've Gone", "By Myself", "'S Wonderful", "How About You?", "Lover, Come Back to Me", "You and the Night and the Music" and "It All Depends on You"
 "Circus Medley" consists of the songs "(Have I Stayed) Too Long at the Fair" and "Look at That Face"
 "Las Vegas Medley" consists of the songs "When You Gotta Go" and "In the Wee Small Hours of the Morning"
 "The Singer" and "I Can Do It" Recorded in 1970 during sessions for the unfinished album The Singer
 "We've Only Just Begun" Recorded in 1971 during sessions for Barbra Joan Streisand
 "Can You Tell the Moment?" Recorded in 1973 during sessions for the unfinished album Life Cycle of a Woman
 "God Bless the Child" Recorded in 1974 during sessions for Butterfly

Highlights from Just for the Record 

Notes 
 "Judy Garland Medley, No. 2" consists of the songs "Get Happy" and "Happy Days Are Here Again"
 "Act II Medley" consists of the songs "Second Hand Rose", "Give Me the Simple Life", "Any Place I Hang My Hat is Home", "Nobody Knows You When You're Down and Out", and "The Best Things in Life Are Free"
 "A Quiet Thing / There Won't Be Trumpets" Recorded in 1974 during sessions for Butterfly
 "Between Yesterday and Tomorrow" Recorded in 1973 during sessions for the unfinished album Life Cycle of a Woman
 "I Know Him So Well" Recorded in 1985 during sessions for The Broadway Album 
 "Warm All Over" and the Duet version of "You'll Never Know" Recorded during sessions for the 1988 version of Back to Broadway

Personnel 
Information is based on AllMusic and the album's liner notes

 Barbra Streisand- Producer (also 3–16 to 3–17, 4–04 to 4-06, 4-08 to 4-09, 4–12), Arranger, Lead Vocals, Liner Notes
 John Arrias - Producer, Recording Engineer (also 4–10, 4–12)
 Richard Baskin - Producer (4-10, 4–12)
 Alan Bergman - Producer (4-04 to 4-06)
 Marilyn Bergman - Producer (4-04 to 4-06)
 Michael Berniker - Producer (1-06 to 1-13, 1-15 to 1–16, 2-03)
 Ralph Burns - Musical Adaptation, Orchestration (2-01 to 2-02)
 Artie Butler - Arranger, Conductor  (3-07)
 Don Costa - Arranger (2-06 to 2-07, 2–11)
 Peter Daniels - Arranger (1-02 to 1-03, 1-06 to 1-14)
 Frank Dookun - Recording Engineer
 Ray Ellis - Arranger (2-14)
 Martin Erlichman - Producer (also 3–13)
 David Foster - Producer, Arranger
 Ian Freebairn-Smith - Arranger (3-16 to 3–17)
 Albhy Galuten - Producer (4-03)
 Barry Gibb - Producer (4-03)
 Jack Gold - Producer (2-14 to 2–16)
 Wally Gold - Producer (2-23, 3–01 to 3-02)
 Billy Goldenberg - Producer, Arranger (3-09)
 Marvin Hamlisch - Arranger (3-12)
 Lennie Hayton - Producer, Arranger (2-22)
 Lee Holdridge - Arranger (3-14 to 3-15, 4–12)
 Rupert Holmes - Producer, Arranger (4-13 to 4–14)
 Debbie Johnson - Recording Engineer
 Randy Kerber - Arranger (4-10)
 Michel Legrand - Associate Producer (4-04 to 4-06), Arranger, Conductor (3-10 to 3–11, 4–04 to 4-06)
 Goddard Lieberson - Producer (1-04)
 Alan Lindgren - Arranger (4-01)
 Mort Lindsey - Musical Director (1-18 to 1-20, 2–12 to 2–13)
 Jeremy Lubbock - Arranger (4-11)
 Peter Matz - Producer (4-08 to 4-09), Arranger (1-15 to 1–16, 2-04, 2–08 to 2–10, 3–01 to 3-02, 4-02, 4–08 to 4-09), Orchestration (3-06), Conductor (1-15 to 1–16, 2-04, 2–08 to 2–10, 3–01 to 3-02, 3-04, 4-02, 4–08 to 4-09)
 Zubin Mehta - Conductor (3-19)
 Robert Mersey - Producer (2-04, 2-06, 2–10 to 2–11)
 Gil Morales - Assistant Audio Mixing
 Lionel Newman - Producer, Arranger (2-22)
 Gene Page - Arranger (3-03, 3-06)
 Marty Paich - Producer, Arranger (3-12)
 Richard Perry - Producer (3-03, 3-06)
 Jon Peters - Producer (3-14 to 3-15)
 Scott Ralston - Assistant Audio Mixing
 Sid Ramin - Arranger (1-04 to 1-05)
 Phil Ramone - Producer (3-16 to 3–17)
 Karl Richardson - Producer (4-03)
 Nelson Riddle - Arranger (2-23)
 Milton Rosenstock - Conductor (2-01 to 2-02)
 Freddie Salem - Guitars, Producer (3-12)
 Walter Scharf - Orchestration (2-15 to 2–16) 
 Thomas Z. Shepard - Producer (2-08 to 2-09)
 David Shire - Arranger (2-10 to 2–13)
 Karen Swenson - Project Coordinator
 Mel Tormé - Arranger (1-18 to 1-20)
 Suzy Vaughan - Sample Clearance Agent
 Ken Welch - Arranger (1-05, 3–13), musical director (1-05)
 Mitzie Welch - Arranger (3–13), musical director (1-05, 3-13)
 Pat Williams - Arranger (3-16)

Charts

Certifications

References

Citations

Bibliography 

1991 greatest hits albums
Barbra Streisand compilation albums
Columbia Records compilation albums